Captain Underpants is an American children's novel by Dav Pilkey, and the inaugural novel of the Captain Underpants series. It was published in September 1997, becoming a hit with children across America. In the novel, George Beard and Harold Hutchins turn their principal, Mr. Krupp, into the "greatest superhero of all time", The Amazing Captain Underpants. It has spawned many sequels and subseries such as Dog Man & The Adventures of Ook and Gluk: Kung-Fu Cavemen from the Future.

Plot summary
In Piqua, Ohio, George Beard and Harold Hutchins are fourth-grade pranksters. When not causing mayhem at Jerome Horwitz Elementary School, they write and draw comics in George's treehouse featuring characters of their own creation, namely Captain Underpants, and sell copies of their comics on the school playground. One day, they pull a series of practical jokes at the school's football game, including putting black pepper in the cheerleaders' pom-poms, filling the bands tubas with soap bubbles and filling the ball with helium, which causes the school to forfeit. The next day, their principal Mr. Krupp tells them he had set up security cameras that filmed George and Harold preparing their pranks and recorded them on a videotape, which he threatens to release unless they obey him. The boys wake up at 6 AM to wash Mr. Krupp's car and mow his lawn, not smile or be disruptive at all during school time, spend lunch and recess cleaning his office, work on Mr. Krupp's house after school, and do extra homework. In order to escape this labor, George orders a "3-D Hypno-Ring" from the Li'l Wiseguy Novelty Company, which they receive after 4 to 6 weeks of grueling labor. The boys then use the ring to hypnotize Mr. Krupp, and Harold replaces the video with one of his little sister's "Boomer the Purple Dragon" sing-along videos.

After reading some of their old comics, the two begin taking turns making Mr. Krupp act in ridiculous ways, such as behaving like a chicken, a monkey, and then finally Captain Underpants. However, Mr. Krupp (as Captain Underpants) jumps out his office window to fight crime, causing the boys to grab some supplies such as fake dog feces and follow him. "Captain Underpants" eventually confronts two bank robbers at a bank, who fall into hysterics. The police arrive and arrest the robbers, but before the cops can arrest Captain Underpants too, the boys whisk him away. Before they can change their principal back, the trio witnesses two robots stealing a large crystal from a shop, and Captain Underpants tries to stop them, resulting in his cape getting caught on the robots' van, dragging him (and the boys) to an old, abandoned warehouse. There, Captain Underpants is tied up while George and Harold hide and watch as Captain Underpants is introduced to the evil Dr. Diaper, who plans to use the crystal to power his Laser-Matic 2000, which will blow up the Moon in twenty minutes, causing huge chunks to destroy every major city on Earth so that he can take over the planet.

George slingshots the fake dog feces between Dr. Diaper's feet. Embarrassed, Dr. Diaper departs to change his diaper, while George and Harold destroy the robots and free Captain Underpants. Harold pulls the machine's self-destruct lever just as Dr. Diaper returns and, enraged, aims his Diaper-Matic 2000 ray gun. Captain Underpants shoots his own underwear at Dr. Diaper's face, covering his eyes. The group, with Captain Underpants wearing a barrel, escapes the warehouse before it explodes and leaves Dr. Diaper tied up for the police to arrest him. The three return to the school, where Captain Underpants dresses back up as Mr. Krupp, at which point George and Harold unsuccessfully try to de-hypnotize him and discover they have seemingly lost the ring's manual. George desperately dumps a vase of water on Mr. Krupp's head, snapping the trance and making Mr. Krupp resolve to give the video to the football team. George finds the manual but throws it away, thinking they won't need it again. The boys remain unaware of a warning not to drench a hypnotized person, which would cause them to return to their trance with the sound of snapping fingers. The Knuckleheads love the "Boomer the Purple Dragon" video and decide to rename themselves the Purple Dragon Sing-a-Long Friends, even though the change doesn't go very well with the fans. George and Harold resume their comic book making and prank-playing. However, they discover that they must keep an eye on Mr. Krupp, who will turn back into Captain Underpants every time he hears fingers snapping.

Characters

Cast
George R. Beard: one of the main protagonists and a 4th grader at Jerome Horwitz Elementary School. Harold's best friend.
Harold M. Hutchins: one of the main protagonists and a 4th grader at Jerome Horwitz Elementary School. George's best friend.
Mr. Benjamin "Benny" Krupp/Captain Underpants: Jerome Horwitz Elementary School's rude and grumpy principal. He especially hates George and Harold, who accidentally hypnotize him into thinking he is their comic book character Captain Underpants.
Dr. Diaper (Dr. Nappy in the UK): The short and somewhat babyish main antagonist who attempts to take over the world by destroying the moon.

Minor
The Horwitz Knuckleheads: the school's football team. After watching the "Boomer the Purple Dragon Sing-a-Long Video" that Harold replaced the prank footage with, they change their name to the Purple Dragon Sing-a-Long Friends.
Two Robots: the secondary antagonists and Dr. Diaper's henchmen.
The Inedible Hunk (from the comics): The antagonist of the Captain Underpants comic. A monster formed from the cafeteria food.
Cheerleaders: The school cheerleaders. George and Harold put black pepper in their pom-poms, which causes them to have a sneezing fit at the school's football game.
The Band: The school's marching band. George and Harold fill up their instruments with bubble bath in one of their pranks.
Mr. Meaner: The coach of the Knuckleheads.
Ms. Ribble: George and Harold's fourth-grade teacher.
Bank Robbers: Two bank robbers whom Captain Underpants tries to apprehend.

Mentioned
Harold's youngest sister: Harold replaces Mr. Krupp's footage with one of her "Boomer the Purple Dragon" videos.

Title change
Early printings of the book have "An Epic Novel by Dav Pilkey" instead of "The First Epic Novel by Dav Pilkey", and the "Little Apple" logo on the cover.

Development
On why he focused on underwear in the book, Pilkey stated "I think underwear is funny because you’re not supposed to laugh at it."

See also
Dav Pilkey
Captain Underpants

References

1997 children's books
American children's novels
Captain Underpants